Glenn Jan Schiller (28 March 1960 — ) is a former Swedish footballer for IFK Göteborg and Djurgårdens IF. He was in the IFK Göteborg 1981–82 UEFA Cup winning side.

References

Swedish footballers
IFK Göteborg players
Djurgårdens IF Fotboll players
1960 births
Living people
UEFA Cup winning players
Association footballers not categorized by position